Shen of the Sea is a collection of short stories written by Arthur Bowie Chrisman. It was first published by Dutton in 1925, illustrated with more than 50 silhouettes by Else Hasselriis. Chrisman won the 1926 Newbery Medal for the work, recognizing the previous year's "most distinguished contribution to American literature for children". 

The original title page shows subtitle A Book for Children and one early dustjacket shows Chinese Stories for Children. Both subtitles have been used for later editions.  

Chrisman's 16 original stories are written in the style of humorous Chinese folk tales.  The title story tells of a king who tries to match wits with the demons of the water in order to save his city from a flood.  Other tales relate the origin of chopsticks, and an instance when mud pies are revealed to be the origin of fine China.

Stories 

Ah Mee's Invention - about the invention of the printing press
Shen of the Sea - a story about tricking demons to save a kingdom
How Wise Were the Old Men - a story about prophecy and the twists life take
Chop-Sticks - about the invention of chop sticks
Buy a Father - a story about morality, primarily obedience
Four Generals - a story about using cleverness to overcome
The Rain King's Daughter - a story about a young woman who uses cleverness to avoid a war
Many Wives - a story about a beautiful young maiden and a not so bright king
That Lazy Ah Fun - about the invention of gunpowder
The Moon Maiden -  a love story
Ah Tcha the Sleeper - a story about tea
I Wish It Would Rain - a story about an over indulged queen
High as Han Hsin - about the invention of the kite
Contrary Chueh Chun - a funny story about a man who always does or believes the opposite
Pies of the Princess - the invention of fine china
As Hai Low Kept House - a funny story about following orders literally and a series of unfortunate circumstances

References

External links

 

1925 children's books
1925 short story collections
American short story collections
Children's short story collections
Short stories set in China
Newbery Medal–winning works
E. P. Dutton books